Mikula Selyaninovich (Mikula the Villager's Son) is a Russian epic hero, a bogatyr - plowman, from the Novgorod Republic bylina cycle.

A common plot trope in bylinas involving Mikula is that another bogatyr of warrior type turns out to be weaker than Mikula: cannot pull his plow out of the soil, cannot lift his bag, cannot race him, etc., because Mother Earth loves him.

References

Russian folklore characters
Slavic mythology
Characters in Bylina